Javid Nikpour (born 1976) is an Iranian photojournalist and sports photographer.

He was photo manager of Iranian photographers in Four Olympic Games (Beijing, London, Rio and Tokyo) and Four Asian Games (Doha, Guangzhou, Incheon and Indonesia).

In 2015, Nikpour won first and third place in the Istanbul Photo Awards, and in 2016, he was one of the winners of the Award of Excellence in Pictures of the Year International. He won the Grand Prix of Paris Sport Photo in 2019.

Life and work
In 2015, he received an Art first-grade diploma in photography (Equivalent degree of PhD) from the Ministry of Culture and Islamic Guidance. He founded Podium Photos in 2016.

Awards 

2004: 2nd place of digital photo on nature
2005: 2nd place of sports photo festival of Iran
2006: 1st place of 3rd specialized festival for sporting press of Iran
2008: The best place in sport photo festival in Islamic Republic Revolt
2009: 1st place in Photo sports festival of Iran
2009: 1st place "Ma Mitavamm" festival of Iran
2009: Top members of Eleventh Iran Photo Biennial
2011: 2nd place for the First Festival National On Cooperatives photo
2015: First and 3rd place of Istanbul Photo Awards in Sports Story
2016: Award of Excellence in 73rd Pictures of the Year International (POYi) winners 
2016: The best place in 8th Fadjr International Festival of visual arts
2018: 1st place of IPPY (Iran press photo of the year) in Sports Single
2019:  Grand Prix and 1 st place of the Paris Sport Photo Festival

References 

1976 births
Living people
People from Tehran
Iranian photojournalists
Iranian photographers
Documentary photographers